This is a list of Members of Parliament (MPs) in the Convention Parliament which began at Westminster on 25 April 1660, and was held until 29 December 1660. It was elected as a "free parliament", i.e. with no oath of allegiance to the Commonwealth or to the monarchy.  
The last parliament called by Royal Authority was originally the Long Parliament called on 3 November 1640, but subsequently reduced to the Rump parliament under Pride's Purge. There were four intervening parliaments called under the Commonwealth. The restored Rump Parliament had finally voted for its own dissolution on 16 March and summoned the new Convention Parliament.

The Convention Parliament was predominantly Royalist in its membership and called back the King, and restored the Constitution in Church and State. After the Declaration of Breda had been received, Parliament proclaimed on 8 May that King Charles II had been the lawful monarch since the death of Charles I in January 1649. The Convention Parliament then proceeded to conduct the necessary preparation for the Restoration Settlement.

List of constituencies and members

  

This list contains details of the MPs elected in 1660.

See also
List of MPs elected to the English parliament in 1659

References

Cobbett's Parliamentary history of England, from the Norman Conquest in 1066 to the year 1803 (London: Thomas Hansard, 1808)
 

17th-century English parliaments
1660
 
1660 in England